Lake Piru is a reservoir located in Los Padres National Forest and Topatopa Mountains of Ventura County, California,  created by the construction in 1955 of the Santa Felicia Dam on Piru Creek, which is a tributary of the Santa Clara River.

The reservoir is more widely known for celebrity incidents: in 1999, actor Harrison Ford crashed his helicopter by the lake, and in 2020 actress Naya Rivera died by drowning. Several other people have drowned in the lake as well. Due to these incidents, swimming at the lake is permanently banned.

United Water Conservation District

The dam is owned and operated by the United Water Conservation District based in nearby Santa Paula, California. The district is a multi-service district providing  flood control, recreation services, surface and groundwater conservation, groundwater replenishment, and wholesale water for agriculture and urban uses to the Santa Clara River Valley and Oxnard Plain.

Lake Piru Recreation Area
The 238 campsites have water and electric hookup along with a snack bar. There are 66 boat slips with a full-service marina. While swimming had been a popular recreational activity, it was formally prohibited in August 2020 following the death of actress Naya Rivera in July that year; the lake had been closed to the public for over a month before the ban was imposed. Prior to this, it was the only lake in the county that permitted swimming.

The lake is situated downstream from Pyramid Lake and can be accessed from Piru Canyon Road near the town of Piru, California.

The California Office of Environmental Health Hazard Assessment (OEHHA) has developed a safe eating advisory for Lake Piru based on levels of mercury or PCBs found in fish caught from this water body.

In 2020, the Lake Piru Recreation Area was closed for several months for various reasons. Besides one week at the start of July, it was closed to the public for almost five months between April and August. It was initially closed before April 4 because of the COVID-19 pandemic, reopening on July 1. It then re-closed a week later following the disappearance of Naya Rivera, and stayed closed until August 20 because of this and, later, the Holser Fire blocking Piru Canyon Road.

Invasive species
Quagga mussels became established in Lake Piru and then downstream in the Lower Piru Creek in 2013. The district has to develop plans to deal with further colonization. The Casitas Municipal Water District that manages nearby Lake Casitas suggested that the reservoir be drained. Poisoning it with a potassium solution was also considered.

Drownings
Due to harsh conditions such as debris, low visibility, different currents, strong winds, and cold water temperatures, a number of fatalities related to drowning have occurred at Lake Piru.

In August 1994, 27-year-old Jesus Danilo Carranza drowned in the lake while on an outing with his family, even though he was wearing a life jacket.
In July 1997, Liborio Dominguez of Long Beach drowned in the lake while trying to rescue his daughter. Dominguez’s body was discovered several days later.
In September 1997, 22-year-old Isidro Castillo of Newhall drowned in the lake and his body was found a day later.
In September 1997, rescue workers recovered the body of 30-year-old Ulises Anthony Mendoza of Port Hueneme, who disappeared days earlier while swimming in the lake.
In February 1998, Lake Piru employee Arthur Raymond Caladara was found drowned in the lake. The details of his death are unknown.
In June 1998, the body of 30-year-old Vy Xuan Dang of Garden Grove was found by a park ranger; he was last seen swimming near a boat days earlier.
In September 2000, 25-year-old Eric Cruz of Van Nuys drowned 10 feet from the shore.
On August 25, 2008, 39-year-old Anatoly Naftoli Smolyansky drowned in the lake. He was on a boat with his family when his 5-year-old daughter fell into the water. Smolyansky jumped into the water to save her, but disappeared beneath the surface as he was pushing her back onto the boat. Smolyansky's 9-year-old son aided in his sister's rescue and both children survived. After a week-long search, Smolyansky's body was found floating north of Diablo Cove by a group of Lake Piru rangers and Ventura County Sheriff’s Search and Rescue divers.
On May 22, 2010, 36-year-old Roberto Barrios disappeared under water while swimming in the lake with friends. His body was found submerged in the lake three days later.
On September 11, 2014, the drowned body of a 28-year-old Piru woman was found. The following day, Ventura County Medical Examiner’s Office described the death as a suicide.
On July 8, 2020, actress Naya Rivera disappeared while swimming in the lake with her son. Rivera's body was recovered on the morning of July 13 following a five-day search. Taking Rivera's death into consideration, as well as similar incidents prior, Ventura County decided to ban swimming at Lake Piru permanently.

Other incidents
On October 23, 1999, actor Harrison Ford was on a training flight in his helicopter when he crashed in a dry riverbed by the lake; both Ford and his instructor were unharmed.

In popular culture 
Parts of the pilot episode of television series Supernatural were filmed at the lake, with the episode focusing on the main characters seeking out the ghost of a drowned woman.

The episode of the series Lost Tapes, "Oklahoma Octopus" was filmed here.

The car chase scenes of NSYNC's music video "Bye Bye Bye" were filmed along Piru Canyon Road leading to the lake.

See also
 List of dams and reservoirs in California

References

External links
 

Piru, Lake
Los Padres National Forest
Santa Clara River (California)
Santa Paula, California
Topatopa Mountains
Piru
Piru
Piru, Lake
Piru
Piru